The Project 58 missile cruisers (Ракетные крейсера проекта 58), known to NATO as the Kynda class and sometimes referred to as the Grozny class (тип «Грозный»),  from the name of the first ship of the series to be constructed, were the first generation of Soviet missile cruisers and represented a considerable advance for the Soviet Navy.  Their main role was anti-surface warfare using the SS-N-3b 'Shaddock' missile. The design proved to be top-heavy and was soon succeeded by the larger , but the Kyndas stayed in service until the fall of the Soviet Union.

Design

The specifications (TTZ in Russian) for this class were issued in 1956.

The main armament comprised two trainable quadruple SS-N-3 anti shipping missile mountings; one forward one aft. One set of reload missiles was carried (16 missiles in total). Defensive armament comprised a twin SA-N-1 missile launcher forward and two twin 76mm guns aft. Two RBU-6000 anti submarine rocket launchers and two triple  torpedo tubes were also fitted. The ships were refitted in the early 1980s with four  close-in weapon system (CIWS) guns.

Machinery comprised high pressure steam turbines in a unit system with alternating boiler rooms and turbine rooms.

The electronics fit consisted of:

Radar:
MR-500 Kliver air search
MR-302 Rubka surface search
Don  DonKay navigation
  
Sonar: 
GAS-372 Gerkules-2M hull mounted

Other systems: 
Zaliv ESM
Krab ECM
Uspekh-U aircraft communications
Yatagan SA-N-1 fire control (Peel Group SA-N-1 Target Acquisition /Target Tracking/Missile Guidance (TA/TT/MG) array
MR105 AK-726 fire control (Hawk Screech) Fire Control for 76mm Guns
Binom P35 Progress fire control

Ships 

The ships were ordered in 1956 and laid down in 1960–1961. All four ships were built by the Zhdanov yard in Leningrad. Initially classified as destroyers and given traditional destroyer names, they were redesignated as rocket cruisers and renamed in September 1962. A total of 16 ships were planned but eventually only four were built, one for each fleet (Baltic, Pacific, Arctic, Black sea). This was notably caused by a priority change, directed towards anti-submarine warfare and the ships being top heavy. The class was followed up by the larger Kresta I-class ships, sharing the main design but optimized primarily for ASW warfare.

  (Fearsome) (Грозный)
 Laid down 23 February 1960
 Launched 26 March 1961
 Completed 30 December 1962
Served in the Baltic Fleet
 Scrapped 1991

  (Адмирал Фокин)
Laid down as Steregushchyy (Watchful) on 5 October 1960
Launched 19 November 1961
Completed 1964
Served in the Pacific Fleet
Scrapped 1993

  (Адмирал Головко)
Laid down as Doblestnyy (Valorous) on 20 April 1960
Launched 18 July 1962
Renamed on 31 October 1962 after Arseniy Golovko
Completed 1964
From 1995 to 1997 she served as flagship of the Black Sea fleet, before being deactivated and removed from service in 2002.

  (Варяг)
Laid down as Soobrazitelnyy (Shrewd) on 13 October 1961
Launched 7 April 1963
 Completed 1965
Served in the Pacific Fleet
Decommissioned 1990. This ship was featured in a Soviet TV documentary in the late 1970s. There were plans to preserve her as a museum.

See also
List of ships of the Soviet Navy
List of ships of Russia by project number

References

External links

 Article from FAS in English
 page on Admiral Golovko from Black Sea Fleet
  All Russian Kynda Class Cruisers - Complete Ship List

Cruiser classes
 
Ships of the Soviet Navy